Per Gustaf Grundén (23 May 1922 – 6 February 2011) was a Swedish singer and actor. He spent a substantial part of his career performing in Vienna at the State Opera and the Volksoper. Later in his operatic career he moved from the romantic lead roles to character parts. He became a screen actor, playing in a large number of Swedish films in the 1980s.

Life and career
Grundén was born in Eskilstuna, Sweden. He studied at the Royal College of Music in Stockholm. His teachers included the Scottish singer and vocal teacher Joseph Hislop. He made his debut as a singer playing Sporting Life in Porgy and Bess at the Stora Theatre in Gothenburg. He remained at the Stora until 1949, when he joined the company of the Oscar Theatre in Stockholm.

As a guest artist, Grundén appeared also at the Royal Opera, in Stockholm, in lyric tenor roles in opera and operetta. He made a particular success in the role of Symon in Der Bettelstudent. In 1953 he joined the company of the Vienna State Opera, appearing in opera and operetta roles. His roles there included the title part in Fra Diavolo, Paris in La belle Hélène and Danilo in The Merry Widow, through 1955. He also performed at the Vienna Volksoper. In 1958, his contribution to music in Vienna was marked by his appointment as Kammersänger. He left the Vienna Volksoper in 1963, but returned to make guest appearances.

Grundén played Danilo in many opera houses in Germany, including Hamburg, Munich and the Deutsche Oper am Rhein. In Sweden he sang the role in a production at the Malmö City Theatre under the direction of Ingmar Bergman in 1954. From 1967 Grundén took to playing character roles. In 1967 he created the role of Lustigs-Per in Skinnarspelet by Rune Lindstrøm and Jan Johansson, written specially for him. He played it in most years until 1982.

In his later career, Grundén acted in Swedish films, including the popular film series Jönssonligan about an inept trio of gangsters. In the satirical comedy Äppelkriget (1971), he played the role of the German businessman Jean Volkswagner.

For the gramophone, Grundén recorded the role of Danilo for Decca in the first stereophonic recording of The Merry Widow, produced in 1958 by John Culshaw, with Hilde Gueden, Waldemar Kmentt and Emmy Loose and the Vienna Philharmonic Orchestra conducted by Robert Stolz. In  1978 he sang in the LP "Ömsom Wien, ömsom Vatten",  a collection of Viennese songs and Swedish sea shanties.

Grundén died in Trosa, Sweden, at the age of 88.

Filmography

Notes

External links

1922 births
2011 deaths
People from Eskilstuna
Swedish operatic tenors
Royal College of Music, Stockholm alumni
Österreichischer Kammersänger
20th-century Swedish male opera singers
Swedish expatriates in Austria